The Delhi Legislative Assembly election was held on 4 December 2013, with the result announced on 8 December resulting in formation of the Fifth Legislative Assembly of Delhi.

The Bharatiya Janata Party won a plurality, closely followed by Aam Aadmi Party, in its first election; this resulted in a hung assembly. After the BJP refused to form a government in the hung assembly, the Aam Aadmi Party's (AAP) Arvind Kejriwal became chief minister with external support from the Indian National Congress (INC).

Electoral law change
This was one of the first five elections in which the Election Commission of India implemented a "None of the above" (NOTA) voting option, allowing the electorate to register a neutral to people any think vote but not to outright reject candidates. In a first, the Election Commission of India also appointed Central Awareness Observers, whose main task was to oversee voter awareness and facilitation.

Contesting parties
There were 810 candidates running for office, including 224 independents.

BJP and SAD formed a pre-poll alliance; SAD contested four seats (Hari Nagar, Rajouri Garden, Kalkaji and Shahdara), while BJP contested the rest.

Campaign
The AAP leader Arvind Kejriwal called the BJP's Harsh Vardhan the "Manmohan Singh of the BJP" as incapable of stemming the "rot" in Delhi's governance. He added: "We will help the people of Delhi get rid of Congress misgovernance first, and then ensure change at the national level in the Lok Sabha polls." However, Vardhan was supported by the BJP's prime ministerial candidate in the 2014 Indian general election, Narendra Modi. The Hindustan Times suggested that the Rajnath Singh-appointed BJP Delhi leader, Vijay Goel, though organisationally competent, lost favour due to his exclusion of established regional leaders in reorganising local units. Singh was still viewed as reluctant to "change horses in mid-stream" but agreed. Modi led the charge, with other party leaders, to have Vardhan as the chief ministerial candidate and Goel himself agreed to the nomination of Vardhan. The AAP released its first electoral manifesto.

Opinion polls

Number of seats

Vote share

Election
There were 11,753 polling stations, including the presence of EVMs, while 630 identified as critical and hypercritical. There were 11.9  million eligible voters, of which 6.6  million were men and 5.3  million were women while there were 405,000 first-time voters. 32,801 Delhi Police personnel and 107 companies of central paramilitary forces were deployed to ensure a peaceful election. Polling stations opened at 8:00 am and turnout was 66%.

Voter-verified paper audit trail (VVPAT) along with EVMs was used in 1 assembly seat in  Delhi elections-New Delhi. Polling stations in Tuglaqabad, Karol Bagh, Trilokpuri and Badarpur reportedly had long waits because EVMs dysfunctioned. In Jungpura, Badli, Krishna Nagar, and Kondli constituencies, some voters complained that their names were on the electoral rolls and that they could not vote.

After voting, party leaders expressed their opinion. Kejriwal said he is confident of a positive result for his party. Vardhan claimed the BJP was "far ahead" of the INC and Aam Aadmi Party. "I can tell you very categorically that we are far ahead of Congress and the new entrant in Delhi politics. I am 100 percent confident about our victory. I think nobody can make any dent in our vote bank. If there is any contest or fight, it is between the Congress and the new entrant (for the second place)." Dikshit said she had her "fingers crossed" on the outcome, while national party leader Sonia Gandhi said from her Nirman Bhavan polling station: "We will win." At many places people with disabilities could not vote due to inaccessible polling booths.

In all over 43,000 postal ballots were received, an increase from the last election's 1,600 postal ballots. The Delhi Election Commission announced that 2,000 Central Paramilitary Force and Delhi Police personnel were at the vote-counting centers in the city on the day of the result announcement and CCTV cameras and live streaming of proceedings through webcasting, two layers of security cover have been set at all the 14 counting centers. Delhi Chief Electoral Officer Vijay Dev said: "Paramilitary force forms the inner circle of security of centers while adequate numbers of Delhi Police personnel will ensure safety from outside. Counting of votes will start from 8 AM tomorrow and during the first-hour postal ballots will be counted." The postal ballots were counted before the EVM votes.

Exit polls showed the BJP in the lead to possibly form a government on its own, followed by the AAP and the incumbent INC in third place; others, in general, were fourth with the BSP following.

Result

Notably, the INC's Chaudhary Prem Singh lost in the Ambedkar Nagar constituency, he held the seat since 1993 and had not lost a single election in 50 years; however, Ashok Kumar of the AAP won the seat. Incumbent Chief Minister Sheila Dikshit lost her New Delhi constituency seat to AAP leader Arvind Kejriwal by a margin that was much more than her total votes and winning hardly 500 votes more than the BJP's Vijender Kumar who finished third; she then submitted her resignation to Lieutenant Governor Najeeb Jung.

|- style="background-color:#E9E9E9; text-align:center;"
! class="unsortable"|
! Political party !! Flag !! Seats  Contested !! Won !! Net changein seats || % of  seats
! Votes !! Vote % !! Change in vote %
|-
| 
| style="text-align:left;" |Bharatiya Janata Party
| 
| 66 || 31 ||  8 || 44.3 || 2,604,100 || 33.07 ||  3
|- style="background: #90EE90;"
| 
| style="text-align:left;" |Aam Aadmi Party
| 
| 69 || 28 || New || 40.0 || 2,322,330 || 29.49 || New
|- style="background: #90EE90;"
| 
| style="text-align:left;" |Indian National Congress
| 
| 70 || 8 ||  35 || 11.4 || 1,932,933 || 24.55 ||  15
|-
| 
| style="text-align:left;" |Janata Dal (United)
| 
| 27 || 1 ||  1 || 1.4 || 68,818 || 0.87 || New
|-
| 
| style="text-align:left;" |Shiromani Akali Dal
|
| 4 || 1 ||  1 || 1.4 || 71,757 || 1 || N/A
|-
| 
| style="text-align:left;" |Independents
|
| 225 || 1 || 0 || 1.4 || || 10 || N/A
|-
|- class="unsortable" style="background-color:#E9E9E9"
! colspan = 4 style="text-align:center;" |Total !! style="text-align:right;" |70 !! colspan=2 style="text-align:center;" |Voters !! 7,699,800 !! style="text-align:center;" |Turnout: 66 % !!
|}

Results by districts

Results by constituency

Reactions
Former Chief Minister Sheila Dikshit said: "We accept our defeat and we will analyze what went wrong. We respect what the people of Delhi have decided and thank them for supporting us for last 15 years."

Government formation
As no party won a majority of the 70 seats in the assembly, if the necessary coalition government is not possible, Delhi would be put under president's rule until a new election is held within six months. However, the INC, BJP, and AAP have all said they would not seek alliances with each other. The other option was to try to bring in independents; though since there are not enough, the media speculated that the other option would be lured away MLAs from another party (the AAP being the most likely in their analysis).

As the BJP won 31 seats, while its alliance partner Shiromani Akali Dal won one seat, they gained a plurality and would have the first right to form a new government. However, they declined the offer from Lieutenant-Governor Najeeb Jung to form a new government citing an inability to obtain a majority. Jung then invited the Aam Aadmi Party to form the government. Kejriwal wrote to BJP national leader Rajnath Singh and INC national leader Sonia Gandhi for clarification on 18 issues before seeking their support in forming a coalition.

On 9 December, Leader of opposition in Rajya Sabha, Arun Jaitley wrote a blog suggesting that Congress should support AAP to form government in Delhi. The BJP did not reply and the INC agreed to 16 of the 18 issues and offered its outside support. On 14 December, BJP Chief Ministerial candidate Dr. Harsh Vardhan asked AAP to take congress support and form the government.  The AAP then sought public opinion through a variety of mediums such as via community meetings, text messages and pamphlets about whether or not it should take the support of the INC. AAP then formed a minority government with outside support from the INC. In a letter to the Lieutenant Governor Najeeb Jung, the AAP did not however mention that it has the support of the INC. Jung then sent his recommendations to President Pranab Mukherjee. 

Kejriwal was then sworn in as 7th Chief Minister of Delhi on 28 December, leading the First Kejriwal cabinet, the youngest cabinet in Delhi ever. M. S. Dhir was elected as the speaker of the legislative assembly on 3 January 2014.

Amongst its first tasks, the AAP initiated a corruption response mechanism in a "durbar"; it also retracted the FDI in multi-brand retail that the previous government had sanctioned. Kejriwal said that though this would give consumers more options it has been shown that it "leads to loss of jobs to a very large extent. There is huge unemployment in Delhi and the AAP government does not wish to increase this unemployment. Delhi is not prepared for FDI." Yet he added that he was not against FDI by itself but that it needed to occur on a case-by-case basis.

Government resignation
After 49 days, Kejriwal resigned as a chief minister following the failure of the introduction of Delhi's Jan Lokpal Bill in the assembly on 14 February 2014. President's rule was then imposed and the assembly was kept in suspended animation. Fresh elections were scheduled for early 2015.

See also
 First Legislative Assembly of Delhi
 Second Legislative Assembly of Delhi
 Third Legislative Assembly of Delhi
 Fourth Legislative Assembly of Delhi
 Fifth Legislative Assembly of Delhi
 Sixth Legislative Assembly of Delhi

References

2013 State Assembly elections in India
2013
2010s in Delhi